The University of Brawijaya (abbreviated as UB), was established on 5 January 1963 and located in Malang. It is an autonomous state university in Indonesia. University of Brawijaya is recognized as one of the elite campuses in Indonesia and consistently ranked 5th in national level by official release from Kemenristekdikti along with University of Indonesia (UI), Bogor Agricultural University (IPB), Gadjah Mada University (UGM), and Bandung Institute of Technology (ITB). In International level, University of Brawijaya ranked 51st in Asia and 400th Worldwide, thus made University of Brawijaya as one of few Indonesian universities which indexed by QS World University Rankings.

University of Brawijaya has 55,469 students from 18 faculties and 221 departments, ranging from the vocational, undergraduate, graduate, postgraduate, and medical specialist programs.

There are four campuses that UB possesses, two of them are located in Malang at Veteran and Dieng, then the rest are in Kediri and Jakarta. The main campus is located in the western part of Malang City with the total area of 60 hectares. It's a very strategic location and it has a great infrastructure. The campus has pleasant climate with a good amount of trees and fresh air.

Overall, University of Brawijaya owns 9,813,664 m2 or 981 hectares and its endowment fund reached 5.12 trillion Rupiah (US$). University of Brawijaya considered as the second biggest and wealthiest university in the country, after University of Indonesia (UI).

History

The name of Brawijaya was granted by the president of the Republic of Indonesia through a wire sent on 11 July 1961. This name is derived from the title of kings of Majapahit, a great kingdom in Indonesia from the twelfth to fifteenth century. The University of Brawijaya transformed into a state university on 5 January 1963, following a presidential decree issued earlier in the same year. This date was later promulgated as University of Brawijaya's anniversary (especially called Dies Natalies among Indonesian academic society members). Before its transformation into a state university in 1967, University of Brawijaya had started its operation in 1957 in Malang, as a branch of the University of Sawerigading Makassar. In those days, this Malang branch had two faculties: Law and Economics. Then, on 1 July 1960, its name was changed to the Municipal University of Malang. Under the new name, two more faculties were established a few months later:  Administration Sciences and Agriculture.

At the time of its transformation into a state university, University of Brawijaya had five faculties: Law, Economics, State Governance and Trade Management (an extension of the Faculty of Trade Administration now called the Faculty of Administrative Science), Agriculture, and Veterinary and Animal Husbandry. In 1973, the Faculty of Veterinary and Animal Husbandry was then divided into the Faculty of Animal Husbandry and the Faculty of Veterinary, which were under Airlangga University. The Faculty of Engineering was established in 1963 based on a decree form the Ministry of Universities and Education Science in the same year.

In 1982, due to a change in University of Brawijaya's organizational structure, the Faculty of Fishery became a separate faculty (since 1977, it had been under the Faculty of Animal Husbandry and Fishery, which was later called the Faculty of Animal Husbandry). Before this date, the Faculty of Fishery had operated since 1963, in Probolinggo, a town about three hours to the northeast from Malang, as a department under University of Brawijaya's Faculty of Veterinary and Agriculture of University of Brawijaya. The Faculty of Medicine has officially been under University of Brawijaya since 1974. Since its establishment, it had been under the Foundation of Higher Education of East Java. The Faculty of Mathematics and Natural Sciences was inaugurated following a decree from the Ministry of Education and Culture dated October 21, 1993. The University of Brawijaya added one more faculty: the Faculty of Agricultural Technology, which was upgraded from the Department of Agricultural Technology, which had been under the Faculty of Agriculture.

The hymn of University of Brawijaya was composed by a student of the Faculty of Veterinary and Animal Husbandry called Yanardhana in 1963, while the march of University of Brawijaya was composed by Lilik Sugiarto in 1996. Both songs are still frequently sung.

Faculties

 Faculty of Law
 Faculty of Economics and Business
 Faculty of Administrative Sciences
 Faculty of Agriculture
 Faculty of Animal Husbandry
 Faculty of Engineering
 Faculty of Medicine
 Faculty of Fisheries and Marine Sciences
 Faculty of Mathematics and Natural Sciences
 Faculty of Agricultural Technology
 Faculty of Social and Political Sciences
 Faculty of Cultural Studies
 Faculty of Dentistry
 Faculty of Computer Science
 Faculty of Veterinary
 Faculty of Vocational Education

Student activities
These are executing units for extracurricular activities university-wide. These activity units are divided based on their characters/fields:

Students' Representative Council
 EM (Students' Executive/Eksekutif Mahasiswa)
 DPM (Students' Representative Council/Dewan Perwakilan Mahasiswa)
 BEM F (Faculty Students' Executive/Badan Eksekutif Mahasiswa Fakultas)
 DPM F (Faculty Students' Representative Council/Dewan Perwakilan Mahasiswa Fakultas)
 Himpunan Jurusan/Program Studi (Majoring Students Association)

Faith and reason interest
 FORMASI (Student Forum for English Conversation)
 FORDIMAPELAR (Student Forum for Reason Development)
 UAPKM (Activity Unit of Campus Press)
 IAAS (International Association of Students in Agricultural and Related Sciences)
 LPM Manifest Law Faculty (Law Press students Association)
 AIESEC

Sports interest
 Badminton
 Basketball
 Chess
 Football
 Karate
 Kempo
 Kendo
 Pencak Silat
 Shooting Sport
 Swimming
 Taekwondo
 Tennis
 Volleyball, etc.

Art interest
 Band
 Choir
 Dance and Traditional Music of Karawitan
 Marching Band
 Theater
 NOLDERAJAT (Student Forum and Training for Cinematography)

Special interest
 Drug Abuse and HIV/AIDS Prevention Team
 Nature Lover Students
 Scout Gerakan Pramuka
 Student Regiment
 Voluntary Corps

Student welfare interest
 KOPMA (Student Cooperative)
 UAKB (Activity Unit for Buddhism Spirituality)
 UAKI (Activity Unit for Islamic Spirituality)
 UAKK (Activity Unit for Christian Spirituality)
 UAKKat (Activity Unit for Catholic Spirituality)
 UNIKAHIDHA (Activity Unit for Hindu Spirituality)

Facilities and campus service

Buildings

 Widyaloka Building is usually used for regional, national, or international seminars; important meetings such as official ones; discussion; studium general.
 Samantha Krida is the biggest building in University of Brawijaya. In this building, many activities have taken place, graduation (diploma, bachelor, master and doctor) and contests, such as choir or English skill contests.
 Student Center Building is for student activities or scientific seminars, student admission, contest/competition, student congress, book fair, and other activities.
 Graha Medika Building is the newest in University of Brawijaya, located in the Faculty of Medicine. In this building special events, such as meetings and wedding receptions, take place regularly.
 PPI Building is a multifunction building where events such as international, national and regional seminars, workshops, etc., take place.
 Alumni Building for the activities of University of Brawijaya alumni association. This building functions as a meeting hall such as working meeting, congress, and so on.

Sport and arts facilities

Sports facilities:
 Universitas Brawijaya Sports Center (UBSC), behind Transmart MX Mall
 Volleyball Court, behind the old central building
 Badminton Court, Samantha Krida building
 Tennis Court, behind Samantha Krida
 Gelanggang Olah Raga (GOR) Pertamina, multi-purpose sport hall for Basketball and Futsal, behind Samantha Krida Building
Arts facilities:
 UB Homeband (activity unit for band lovers). Facilities for playing music organized by the activity unit of band lovers in University of Brawijaya.
 Traditional Javanese Music and Dance

Rest facilities:
 UB Hotel

Former facilities:
 Brawijaya Stadium, demolished; now the space is used for the new building for Faculty of Social and Political Sciences (FISIP) building

Disability Services 
Disability services is provided by Center for Disability Studies and Services Brawijaya University. The center focuses mainly in ensuring inclusion for persons with disabilities in higher education.

Award
A medical student was awarded the second prize in the Indonesian Science Institute (LIPI) experiment competition. Using lab rats, he found salmonella bacteria can get rid of fatty residue in subject's arteries which may be used as a future remedy for people suffering from heart disease.

International cooperation

  Kassel University, Germany
  Universität Leipzig, Germany
  Miyazaki University, Japan
  Yamaguchi University, Japan
  International Institute of Multicultural Studies Annaka, Japan
  Kumamoto University, Japan
  Shibaura Institute of Technology, Japan
  Burapha University, Thailand
  Kyungpook National University, South Korea
  Chiayi University, Taiwan
  Massey University, New Zealand
  University of Wollongong, Australia
  University of Canberra, Australia

References

External links

 
 Faculty Of Fisheries and Marine Sciences
 Faculty of Law
 Faculty of Economics and Bisnis
 Faculty of Administrative Sciences
 Faculty of Agriculture
 Faculty of Animal Husbandry
 Faculty of Engineering
 Medical Faculty
 Faculty of Mathematics and Natural Sciences
 Faculty of Agricultural Technology
 Faculty of Cultural Studies
 Faculty of Computer Sciences  
 DPM University of Brawijaya

 
1963 establishments in Indonesia
Educational institutions established in 1963
Universities in Indonesia
Universities in East Java
Malang
Indonesian state universities